Voltaic Union was a political party in Upper Volta. It was formed soon after World War II on the initiative of the French governor Albert Mouragues, and Mouragues was accused of interference in the June 1948 local elections on behalf of the party. Early members included Joseph Conombo, Henri Guissou, Joseph Ouedraogo and Maurice Yaméogo.

In the 1951 elections UV sent four members to the National Assembly: Dr. Joseph Conombo, Henri Guissou, Nazi Boni and Mamadou Ouédraogo.

However, when its main backer, Governor Mouragues, left Upper Volta in 1953, the unity of UV became fragile. In 1955 Conombo and Guissou formed a new party, the Social Party for the Emancipation of the African Masses  (PSEMA). Similarly Nazi Boni founded the African Popular Movement (MPA) the same year.

References
 
 Englebert, Pierre. La Revolution Burkinabè. Paris: L'Harmattan, 1986.

Defunct political parties in Burkina Faso
Political parties established in the 1940s